Pedro Cavadas may refer to:

Pedro Cavadas (surgeon) (born 1965), Spanish surgeon
Pedro Cavadas (footballer) (born 1992), Portuguese footballer